Forallac is a village and municipality in the province of Girona and autonomous community of Catalonia, Spain. It includes the village of Peratallada.

References

External links
 Government data pages 

Municipalities in Baix Empordà
Populated places in Baix Empordà